Szenttamás (meaning: "Saint Thomas" (for Saint Thomas Becket) is the eastern part of the city of Esztergom in Hungary, on the right bank of the river Danube. It was a separate village until 1895, when it was merged with the "Royal Esztergom" as 2nd district, along with neighboring Víziváros and Szentgyörgymező. It's located on the Szent Tamás Hill.

Tourism
Our Lady of Sorrows Chapel (Classicist) and Baroque Calvary on the top of the hill.
Esztergom Synagogue
Fürdő Szálló (Bath Hotel) in ruins
Komárom-Esztergom County Archives (former Village Hall)
Duna (Danube) Museum - Hungarian Museum of Water Administration and Environmental Protection

Gallery

References
 Borovszky Samu: Esztergom Vármegye
 Szent István városa – Esztergom története (szerk Meggyes Miklósné)

External links

Neighbourhoods of Esztergom
Former municipalities of Hungary
Thomas Becket